The Green Ghost Project is a collaborative album by American rapper Styles P and record producer DJ Green Lantern. It was released on February 2, 2010, via DJ Green Lantern's label Invasion Records. The album features guest appearances from M.O.P., N.O.R.E., Uncle Murda and Junior Reid, as well as Style P's D-Block cohorts Jadakiss and Sheek Louch, among others. The album's production was handled by DJ Green Lantern, Dame Grease, The Alchemist, Buckwild, Dutchez Beatz, Statik Selektah, Vinny Idol and Poobs.

Track listing

Charts

References

2010 albums
Styles P albums
Albums produced by DJ Green Lantern
Albums produced by the Alchemist (musician)
Collaborative albums
Albums produced by Dame Grease
Albums produced by Buckwild
Albums produced by Scram Jones
Albums produced by Statik Selektah